Canolol is a phenolic compound found in crude canola oil. It is produced by decarboxylation of sinapic acid during canola seed roasting.

See also 

Phenolic content in wine
Syringaldehyde
Syringol
Syringic acid
Acetosyringone
Sinapyl alcohol
Sinapaldehyde
Sinapinic acid
Sinapine

References 

O-methylated natural phenols
Vinyl compounds
Vegetable oils